R710 road may refer to:
 R710 road (Ireland)
 R710 (South Africa)